The Ribeirão Santa Maria is a river of Pará state in north-central Brazil. It is considered an extension of the Rio Pará distribution channel.

See also
List of rivers of Pará

References
Brazilian Ministry of Transport

Rivers of Pará